Sokolovac is a village and municipality in the Koprivnica–Križevci County in Croatia. According to the 2011 census, there are 3,417 inhabitants in the area, Croats forming a majority at 85.4%.

History
In the late 19th century and early 20th century, Sokolovac was part of the Bjelovar-Križevci County of the Kingdom of Croatia-Slavonia. Serbian Orthodox Lepavina Monastery established in 1550 is located within the boundaries of the municipality.

References

Municipalities of Croatia
Populated places in Koprivnica-Križevci County